American Bandstand is an album by American keyboardist and composer Wayne Horvitz recorded in 1999 and released on the Canadian Songlines label. The album was later released under the title Forever after Dick Clark objected to the original title.

Reception
The Allmusic review by Tim Sheridan awarded the album 4½ stars stating "Working with his band Zony Mash in an acoustic setting, Horvitz creates an album that is rich with flavor".

Track listing
All compositions by Wayne Horvitz
 "Ben's Music" - 4:36   
 "Prepaid Funeral" - 5:45   
 "Love, Love, Love" - 4:43   
 "Capricious Midnight" - 3:18   
 "9 To 4" - 4:44   
 "In the Ballroom" - 5:19   
 "Forever" - 5:16   
 "Disingenuous Firefight" - 5:13   
 "Tired" - 5:26   
 "Little Man" - 3:35   
 "American Bandstand" - 5:08
Recorded at Studio Litho in Seattle, Washington on July 19 & 20, 1999

Personnel
Wayne Horvitz - piano
Timothy Young - guitar
Keith Lowe - bass
Andy Roth - drums

References

Wayne Horvitz albums
2000 albums